Briercliffe (historically Briercliffe-with-Extwistle) is a civil parish in the borough of Burnley, in Lancashire, England. The parish contains suburbs of Burnley (including Harle Syke and Haggate), and the rural area north east of the town. Hamlets in the parish include Cockden, Lane Bottom and in the Extwistle area, the tiny hamlet of Roggerham. According to the United Kingdom Census 2011, the parish has a population of 4,031.

The parish adjoins the Burnley parish of Worsthorne-with-Hurstwood and the unparished area of Burnley, the Pendle parishes of Brierfield, Nelson and Trawden Forest and West Yorkshire.

History
Extwistle may have been named from the junction (O.E. ) of Swinden Water and the River Don, while the first element could be a corruption of oxen.

The parish contains a number of sites of early human occupation, including:
 
The site is located on Broad Bank Hill, overlooking the valley of Thursden Brook. Thought to be a prehistoric settlement, limited archaeological excavation in 1950 recovered some Neolithic finds but was insufficient to more accurately date the site.

Seven stones, some of which are still standing, have been arranged in a  circle. Limited archaeological excavation on the cairn was undertaken in 1842, during which three interment urns were discovered.

Pike Low bowl barrow and site of beacon, Bonfire Hill - Located on the summit of Bonfire Hill is a bowl barrow thought to date from the Bronze Age. The site was used as part of a system of warning beacons during the medieval period and the top of the mound has been flattened to create a platform for the bonfire. This is a rare example of such a combination.

Beadle Hill Romano-British farmstead - Located at the western end of Beadle Hill, with extensive views over the surrounding area. Inner and outer ditches are separated by an earth and stone rampart, around a farmstead enclosure about  square, with an entrance on the eastern side.

Twist Castle Romano-British farmstead - Located at the western end of Twist Hill, with extensive views over the surrounding area. There would also have been an outer ditch but little trace now remains. Attached to the south eastern side of the enclosure, next to the entrance, is a  square annexe also with an earth and stone wall.

After the Norman conquest of England, Briercliffe was part of the manor of Ightenhill, itself a part of the Honour of Clitheroe. Extwistle had been granted as a manor by the 12th century, when the mesne lord Richard de Malbis gave half of its land to the canons of Newbo Abbey. The remaining half seems to have come into the possession of the Abbot of Kirkstall Abbey during the 1300s.

Extwistle Hall

Extwistle Hall stands high on Extwistle Moor between Haggate (east of Brierfield) and the village of Worsthorne. The Hall, built of coursed sandstone on three sides of a courtyard, is now a ruin. It was built in the 16th century in the Tudor style by the Parker family who were prominent in local affairs.

Robert Parker had bought the land, which had previously belonged to Kirkstall Abbey, in 1537 after the Dissolution of the Monasteries. The Parker family occupied it for some two hundred years before moving to Cuerden Hall around 1718. John Parker was High Sheriff of Lancashire for 1653 and Robert Parker for 1710. The house was remodelled in the late 18th century.

The listed Grade II* building, owned by an Isle of Man based property company, has been unoccupied for more than twenty years and is listed in English Heritage's Heritage at Risk Register. In January 2012, £2million plans were revealed to save and restore the hall to its former glory, then afterwards to be sold off.

Governance

Briercliffe-with-Extwistle was once a township in the ancient parish of Whalley, becoming a civil parish in 1866. In 1894, the parish was dissolved, part in the southwest moving into the county borough of Burnley, with the rest becoming a new parish called Briercliffe, forming part of the Burnley Rural District. Since 1974 Briercliffe has formed part of the Borough of Burnley. 2004 saw the parish gain some territory from the unparished area of Burnley at the western end of Harle Syke.

The Briercliffe ward on the borough council covers the same area as the parish along with a small part of Burnley. The ward elects three councillors, currently Margaret Lishman, Anne Kelly and Gordon Lishman, all from the Liberal Democrats. The parish is represented on Lancashire County Council as part of the Burnley Rural division, represented since 2017 by Cosima Towneley (Conservative).

The Member of Parliament for Burnley, the constituency into which the parish falls, is Antony Higginbotham (Conservative), who was first elected in 2019.

Demography
According to the United Kingdom Census 2011, the parish has a population of 4,031, an increase from 3,187 in the 2001 census.

Harle Syke and Haggate form part of a wider urban area, which had a population of 149,796 in 2001. A similar but larger, Burnley Built-up area defined in the 2011 census had a population of 149,422.

In 2011 the average (mean) age of residents was 40 years, with a roughly even distribution between males and females. The racial composition was 98.1% White (96.8% White British), 1.1% Asian, 0.1% Black, 0.6% Mixed and 0.1% Other. The largest religious groups were Christian (73%) and Muslim (0.7%). 76.3% of adults between the ages of 16 and 74 were classed as economically active and in work.

People

Tattersall Wilkinson was a local antiquarian most usually known as 'The Sage Of Roggerham'. Tattersall was well known in Burnley during the late 1800s. He was the first person to uncover the flint daggers and stone circles of nearby Worsthorne, and other antiquities such as burial urns. He also wrote many articles for the Burnley Express and a book of his own (with J.F Tattersall) named 'Memories Of Hurstwood'.

Media gallery

See also

Listed buildings in Briercliffe
Scheduled monuments in Lancashire

References
Notes

Citations

External links

Map of Briercliffe (272) and Extwistle (273) parish boundaries
The Briercliffe Society

Civil parishes in Lancashire
Geography of Burnley